Yeonsangun of Joseon or Prince Yeonsan of Joseon (23 November 1476 – 20 November 1506), personal name Yi Yung (Korean: 이융; Hanja: 李㦕), was the tenth ruler of the Joseon dynasty of Korea. Often considered the worst tyrant in Joseon's history and perhaps all Korean history, he is notorious for launching two bloody purges, seizing hundreds of women from all over the peninsula to serve as palace entertainers, and appropriating Sungkyunkwan as a personal pleasure ground. Yeonsangun's despotic rule provided a stark contrast to the liberal era of his father, and as a much-despised overthrown monarch, he did not receive a temple name.

Biography

Execution of his mother
Lady Yun, later known as the Deposed Queen Yun, served Yeonsangun's father, King Seongjong, as a concubine until the death of Queen Gonghye, Seongjong's first wife. With no heir, the king was urged by counselors to take a second wife to secure the royal succession. Lady Yun was chosen for her beauty and was formally married in 1476. Several months later, she gave birth to Yi Yung.

The new queen proved to be temperamental and highly jealous of the other concubines, even going as far as poisoning one of them in 1477. One night in 1479, she physically struck her husband and left scratch marks. Despite his efforts to conceal the injury, Seongjong's mother, Royal Queen Dowager Insu, discovered the truth and ordered Lady Yun into exile. After several attempts to restore the deposed queen to her former position, government officials petitioned that she be executed. Queen Yun died in 1482, after being ordered to commit suicide by drinking poison.

Literati purges

The crown prince grew up believing that he was the son of Queen Jeonghyeon, his father's third wife. He succeeded to the throne in 1495 and during his early reign, he was a wise and able administrator who strengthened the national defense and aided the poor. However, he also showed signs of a violent side when he killed Jo Sa-seo, one of his tutors, soon after becoming king.

Yeonsangun eventually learned the truth about his biological mother and attempted to posthumously restore her titles and position. However, government officials belonging to the Sarim faction opposed his efforts on account of serving Seongjong's will, and greatly displeased, Yeonsangun started looking for ways to eliminate them.

In 1498, Gim Il-son, a disciple of Gim Jong-jik, included a paragraph in the royal records that was critical of King Sejo's coup d'état (1455). Gim Il-son and other followers of Gim Jong-jik were accused of treason by a rival faction, giving the king cause enough to order the execution of many Sarim officials and the mutilation of Gim Jong-jik's remains. This came to be known as the First Literati Purge (Muo Sahwa; 무오사화, 戊午士禍).

In 1504, Im Sa-hong revealed to Yeonsangun the details of his mother's death and showed him a blood-stained piece of clothing, the blood allegedly vomited by her after taking poison. Subsequently, Yeonsangun beat to death two of his father's concubines, Lady Jeong and Lady Eom, for their part in his mother's death. His grandmother, Grand Royal Queen Dowager Insu, also passed away soon after he pushed her during an altercation. He sentenced to death many government officials who had supported the execution of his mother, now posthumously honored as "Queen Jeheon" (제헌왕후, 齊獻王后), and ordered the grave of Han Myeong-hoe to be opened and the head to be cut off the corpse. Yeonsangun went as far punishing officials who were simply present at the royal court at that time, for the crime of not preventing the actions of those who abused his mother. Meanwhile, Im Sa-hong and his allies were promoted and they received many important offices and other rewards. This came to be known as the Second Literati Purge (Gapja Sahwa; 갑자사화, 甲子士禍).

Suppression of free speech and learning
Yeonsangun closed Sungkyunkwan, the royal university, as well as the Wongaksa Temple, and converted them into personal pleasure grounds, for which young girls were gathered from the eight provinces. He also demolished a large residential area in the capital and evicted 20,000 residents to build hunting grounds. People were forced into involuntary labor to work on these projects. Many commoners mocked and insulted him with posters written in hangul, and in retaliation, Yeonsangun banned the use of the script.

When court officials protested against his actions, he abolished the Office of Censors (whose function was to criticize any inappropriate actions or policies of the king) and the Office of Special Advisors (a library and research institute that advised the king with Confucian teachings). He ordered his ministers to wear a sign that read: "A mouth is a door that brings in disaster; a tongue is a sword that cuts off a head. A body will be in peace as long as its mouth is closed and its tongue is deep within" (口是禍之門 舌是斬身刀 閉口深藏舌 安身處處牢).

Chief Eunuch Gim Cheo-sun, who had served three kings, tried to convince him to change his ways, but Yeonsangun killed him by shooting arrows and personally cutting off his limbs. In addition, he also punished the eunuch's relatives down to the 7th degree, and when he asked the royal secretaries whether such punishment was appropriate, they did not dare to say otherwise.

Dethronement

In 1506, the 12th year of Yeonsangun's reign, a group of officials — notably Park Won-jong, Seong Hui-an, Yu Sun-jeong, and Hong Gyeong-ju — plotted against the despotic ruler. They launched their coup in September 1506, deposing the king and replacing him with his younger half-brother, Grand Prince Jinseong. The king was demoted to "Prince Yeonsan" (Yeonsangun; 燕山君, 연산군) and sent into exile on Ganghwa Island, where he died after two months.  His concubine, Jang Nok-su, who had encouraged and supported his misrule, was beheaded. In addition, despite the new king's reluctance, Yeonsangun's four young sons were also forced to commit suicide only a few weeks later.

Family
 Father: King Seongjong of Joseon (조선 성종) (19 August 1457 – 20 January 1495)
Grandfather: King Deokjong of Joseon (조선 덕종) (3 October 1438 – 2 September 1457)
Grandmother: Queen Sohye of the Cheongju Han clan (소혜왕후 한씨) (7 October 1437 – 11 May 1504)
 Biological mother: Deposed Queen Yun of the Haman Yun clan (폐비 윤씨) (15 July 1455 – 29 August 1482) 
Grandfather: Yun Gi-gyeon (윤기견)
Grandmother: Lady Shin of the Goryeong Shin clan (고령 신씨)
 Adoptive mother: Queen Jeonghyeon of the Papyeong Yun clan (정현왕후 윤씨) (21 July 1462 – 13 September 1530)
Consorts and their respective issue(s):
 Deposed Queen Shin of the Geochang Shin clan (폐비 신씨) (15 December 1476 – 16 May 1537)
 Yi Su-eok, Deposed Princess Hwisin (폐휘신공주 이수억) (2 September 1491 – ?), first daughter
 Second daughter
 Crown Prince Yi Bin-i, first son (왕세자 이빈이)(1494 – 1494)
 Third daughter (1495 – ?)
 Deposed Crown Prince Yi Hwang (폐세자 이황) (10 January 1498 – 24 September 1506), second son
 Yi Seong, Deposed Grand Prince Changnyeong (폐창녕대군 이성) (18 June 1500 – 24 September 1506), fourth son
 Yi In-su (이인수) (1501 – 12 September 1503), sixth son
 Seventh son (1502 – ?)
 Deposed Royal Consort Sug-ui of the Yangseong Yi clan (폐숙의 이씨)
 Yi In, Deposed Prince Yangpyeong (폐양평군 이강수) (1498 – 1506), third son
 Deposed Royal Consort Sug-ui of the Haepyeong Yun clan (폐숙의 윤씨) (1481 – 1568)
 Deposed Royal Consort Sug-ui of the Hyeonpung Gwak clan (폐숙의 곽씨)
 Deposed Royal Consort Sug-ui of the Gwon clan (폐숙의 권씨)
 Deposed Royal Consort Sug-ui of the Yeoheung Min clan (폐숙의 민씨) (? – 1519)
 Deposed Royal Consort Sug-yong of the Heungdeok Jang clan (폐숙용 장씨) (? – 1506)
 Yi Yeong-su (이영수) (1502 – ?), sixth daughter
 Deposed Royal Consort Sug-yong of the Damyang Jeon clan (폐숙용 전씨) (? – 1506)
 Ninth daughter
 Deposed Royal Consort Sug-yong of the Jo clan (폐숙용 조씨)
 Deposed Royal Consort Sug-won of the Choe clan (폐숙원 최씨)
 Deposed Royal Consort Sug-won of the Gim clan (폐숙원 김씨) (? – 1506)
 Deposed Royal Consort Sug-won of the Jang clan (폐숙원 장씨)
 Deposed Royal Consort Sug-won of the Yi clan (폐숙원 이씨)
 Palace Maid Jeong (나인 정씨)
 Yi Ham-geum (이함금), eighth daughter
 Palace Maid Choe (나인 최씨) (? – 1504)
 Palace Maid Su (나인 수씨) (? – 1504)
 Palace Maid Gim (나인 김씨) (? – 1506)
 Yeowan Wolhamae (여완 월하매) (? – 1506)
 Yeowan Ahn of the Ahn clan (여원 안씨)
 Medical Lady Gang (의녀 강씨)
 Lady Jang (장씨)
 Unknown
 Yi Bok-eok (이복억)(1499 - ?), fourth daughter
 Yi Bok-hak (이복합)(1501 - ?), fifth daughter
 Yi Dong-su (이돈수)(1501 - 1506), fifth son
 Yi Chong-su (이총수)(? - 1503), eighth son
 Yi Yeong-su (이영수)(? - 1503), ninth son
 Yu Jeong-su (이정수)(1505 - ?), seventh daughter
 Yi Tae-su (이태수)(1506 - 1506), tenth son

Ancestry

In popular culture 
 Portrayed by Shin Young-kyun in the 1961 film Prince Yeonsan.
 Portrayed by Yu In-chon in the 1988 film Diary of King Yeonsan.
Portrayed by Yoo Dong-geun in the 1995 KBS TV series Jang Nok Soo.
 Portrayed by Ahn Jae-mo and Gim Hak-joon in the 1998–2000 KBS1 TV series The King and Queen.
 Portrayed by Gim Yang-woo in the 2001–2002 SBS TV series Ladies in the Palace.
Portrayed by Jung Ki-sung in the 2003–2004 MBC TV series Dae Jang Geum.
Portrayed by Jung Jin-young in the 2005 film The King and the Clown.
 Portrayed by Jung Yoon-seok and Jung Tae-woo in the 2007–2008 SBS TV series The King and I. 
 Portrayed by Jin Tae-hyun in the 2011–2012 JTBC TV series Insu, the Queen Mother.
 Portrayed by Kim Kang-woo in the 2015 film The Treacherous.
 Portrayed by Kim Ji-suk in 2017 MBC TV series The Rebel.
 Portrayed by Ahn Do-gyu and Lee Dong-gun in 2017 KBS2 TV series Queen for Seven Days.

See also

List of monarchs of Korea
History of Korea
Politics of the Joseon dynasty

Notes

References

1476 births
1506 deaths
Leaders ousted by a coup
15th-century Korean monarchs
16th-century Korean monarchs
Dethroned monarchs